2894, or The Fossil Man (A Midwinter Night's Dream) is an 1894 utopian novel written by Walter Browne. It is one entrant in the major wave of utopian and dystopian literature that characterized the final decades of the nineteenth century.

The book deals with a reversal of the traditional gender roles, and describes a society of "dominant women and submissive men." It is one of a group of speculative fiction works in its generation that took a position, pro or con, on feminism and gender roles.

2894 is one of the rarest works in the English language.

References

External links 

2894 Full-Text online via St. Louis Mercantile Library

Utopian novels
1894 American novels
1894 science fiction novels
Feminist science fiction novels
Fiction set in the 29th century